8991 Solidarity, provisional designation , is a carbonaceous asteroid from the middle region of the asteroid belt, approximately 10 kilometers in diameter. It was discovered on 6 August 1980, by observers at ESO's La Silla Observatory site in northern Chile. The asteroid was named in response to the September 11 attacks.

Orbit and classification 

Solidarity orbits the Sun in the central main-belt at a distance of 2.3–3.3 AU once every 4 years and 8 months (1,700 days). Its orbit has an eccentricity of 0.18 and an inclination of 7° with respect to the ecliptic. The first used observation was made at Cerro El Roble Observatory in 1979, extending the body's observation arc by 1 year prior to its official discovery observation at La Silla.

Physical characteristics

Rotation period 

In January 2011, a rotational lightcurve of Solidarity was obtained from photometric observations at the Palomar Transient Factory in California. It gave a rotation period of  hours with a brightness variation of 0.19 magnitude.

Diameter and albedo 

According to the survey carried out by the NEOWISE mission of NASA's Wide-field Infrared Survey Explorer, Solidarity measures 8.4 kilometers in diameter and its surface has an albedo of 0.17, while the Collaborative Asteroid Lightcurve Link assumes a standard albedo for carbonaceous asteroids of 0.057 and calculates a diameter of 12.9 kilometers with an absolute magnitude of 13.18.

Naming 

This minor planet was named "Solidarity" in response to the September 11 attacks. As a commemorative gesture, the IAU's Committee for the Nomenclature of Small Bodies chose three objects discovered in observatories on different continents and christened them with names representing some of the most basic and universal human values. The other two selections were 8990 Compassion (discovered from Europe) and 8992 Magnanimity (discovered from Asia). The official naming citation was published by the Minor Planet Center on 2 October 2001.

References

External links 
 Asteroid Lightcurve Database (LCDB), query form (info )
 Dictionary of Minor Planet Names, Google books
 Asteroids and comets rotation curves, CdR – Observatoire de Genève, Raoul Behrend
 Discovery Circumstances: Numbered Minor Planets (5001)-(10000) – Minor Planet Center
 
 

008991
008991
Named minor planets
19800806